Guty Espadas (born December 20, 1954) is a Mexican former professional boxer who won the WBA flyweight title. He is also the father of former World Champion Guty Espadas Jr.

Early life
He was born to Hernan Espadas Cruz and Isabel Cruz Espadas.

Professional career
He became a professional boxer in 1971.

WBA Flyweight Championship
He won the WBA Flyweight Championship on October 2, 1976, when he knocked out Alfonso Lopez in thirteen rounds. He defended the title four times before losing it to Betulio González on August 12, 1978, via a fifteen-round majority decision. He challenged twice more for world titles, although he was unsuccessful in both tries. After his final try, a tenth-round knockout loss to Payao Poontarat in 1984, he retired.

Personal life
His son, Guty Espadas Jr., was a boxing champion in the Featherweight division.

Professional boxing record

See also
List of flyweight boxing champions
List of WBA world champions
List of Mexican boxing world champions
Notable boxing families

References

External links

1954 births
Living people
Flyweight boxers
Sportspeople from Mérida, Yucatán
Boxers from Yucatán (state)
World boxing champions
World flyweight boxing champions
World Boxing Association champions
Mexican male boxers